The Majestic Majesty is the acoustic accompaniment to Portugal. The Man's fourth full-length album The Satanic Satanist and features all of the album's songs performed acoustically, except the track "Let You Down."

This release marks the first official release of any acoustic Portugal. The Man songs, often requested by fans and something for which the band had been renowned. The album's artwork is a contour line drawing of the artwork for The Satanic Satanist, itself a watercolor by the band's lead singer, John Gourley

The album was released digitally, and made available to purchase through the band's merchnow store, and the iTunes and Amazon music stores in the deluxe version of The Satanic Satanist.  It was also given away to those who pre-ordered The Satanic Satanist. It received a vinyl release courtesy of Suburban Home Records.

The titles "The Satanic Satanist" and "The Majestic Majesty" are references to The Rolling Stones' album "Their Satanic Majesties Request".

Track listing

Personnel
John Baldwin Gourley
Jason Sechrist
Ryan Neighbors
Zachary Scott Carothers

References

2009 albums
Portugal. The Man albums
Equal Vision Records albums